John Rolfe Apartments is a historic apartment building located in Richmond, Virginia.  The building was built in 1940, and is a two and three-story, ten-unit, International style brick building. The rectangular building has concrete copings at the edges of the staggered flat roofs. The building's sloped setting is park-like with a heavy buffer of trees to the south and an open lawn and trees along the north property line. The building is considered a rare and early example of International Style residential architecture in the city of Richmond and the region.

It was listed on the National Register of Historic Places in 2010.

References

Residential buildings on the National Register of Historic Places in Virginia
International style architecture in Virginia
Residential buildings completed in 1940
Buildings and structures in Richmond, Virginia
National Register of Historic Places in Richmond, Virginia